The SparkassenPark is a multi-use stadium in Mönchengladbach, Germany.  It is currently used mostly for American football and field hockey matches and hosted the 2006 Men's Hockey World Cup, the 2008 Women's Hockey Champions Trophy, the 2010 Men's Hockey Champions Trophy and the 2013 Women's Hockey Junior World Cup . The stadium is run by former German field hockey international Michael Hilgers. It is also used by the American football team Mönchengladbach Mavericks.

Concerts

Gallery

References

External links

 official website
 World Stadiums Site

Field hockey venues in Germany
American football venues in Germany
Sport in Mönchengladbach
Sports venues in North Rhine-Westphalia